Fotios "Freddy" Geas (born April 4, 1967) is an American criminal associated with the Genovese crime family, based in New York City. He is a former Mafia hitman operating out of Springfield, Massachusetts and often worked with his brother Ty. He was accused of having orchestrated the 2018 murder of Winter Hill Gang mobster Whitey Bulger in prison, and was charged in relation to the incident in August 2022.

Criminal career
Geas was born into a Greek family; therefore, he could not be a made member of the Italian Mafia. Geas and his brother Ty were well known enforcers feared within their community. The Geas brothers worked with Anthony Arillotta, another mobster. In 2003, Arillotta was formally inducted into the Genovese crime family. Arillotta had requested that the Geas brothers kill his brother-in-law, Gary Westerman. Acting boss Arthur Nigro organized a hit on aging gangster Adolfo Bruno. Both hits were carried out in 2003.

In 2011, Geas was charged with the murders of Gary Westerman and Adolfo Bruno. He was also indicted as the getaway driver in the failed assassination attempt of Bronx union boss, Frank Dabado, after Dabado was involved in an argument with Nigro over Tony Bennett concert tickets.

During the 2011 trial, Geas was shocked to see his former associate Arillotta testify against him. Geas was known for his strict code. He despised snitches and men who abused women. Geas refused to cooperate with law enforcement and was sentenced to life in prison.

Murder of Whitey Bulger
On October 29, 2018, infamous Boston gangster Whitey Bulger was transferred from the Federal Transfer Center in Oklahoma City to United States Penitentiary, Hazelton, in West Virginia. At 8:20 a.m. on October 30, the 89-year-old Bulger was found unresponsive in the prison. Bulger was in a wheelchair and had been beaten to death by multiple inmates armed with a sock-wrapped padlock and a shiv. His eyes had nearly been gouged out and his tongue almost cut off. This was the third homicide at the prison in a 40-day span.

Correctional officers had warned Congress just days before the most recent Hazelton death that facilities were being dangerously understaffed. Geas was the primary suspect in orchestrating the killing of Bulger. In August 2022, he along with Paul DeCologero and Sean McKinnon were indicted on first degree murder charges.

References

1967 births
Genovese crime family
People from Springfield, Massachusetts
American gangsters of Greek descent
Criminals from Massachusetts
Mafia hitmen
Living people